Mettauertal is a municipality in the district of Laufenburg in the canton of Aargau in Switzerland.  On 1 January 2010 the municipalities of Hottwil, Etzgen, Mettau, Oberhofen and Wil merged to form the new municipality of Mettauertal.

Geography
Of this area, about 51.2% is used for agricultural purposes, while 40.1% is forested. Of the rest of the land, 7.5% is settled (buildings or roads) and 1.3% is unproductive land.

Demographics
, 11.3% of the population are resident foreign nationals. Over the last 3 years (2010-2013) the population has changed at a rate of -1.39%. The birth rate in the municipality, in 2013, was 9.4 while the death rate was 5.2 per thousand residents.

, children and teenagers (0–19 years old) make up 18.8% of the population, while adults (20–64 years old) are 62.4% and seniors (over 64 years old) make up 18.7%.

Historic Population
The historical population is given in the following chart:

Heritage sites of national significance

The Hottwil, a former untervogtei residence with outbuildings and the catholic parish church in Mettau are listed as Swiss heritage sites of national significance.

Economy
, there were a total of 807 people employed in the municipality.  Of these, a total of 150 people worked in 56 businesses in the primary economic sector.  The secondary sector employed 361 workers in 41 separate businesses.  Finally, the tertiary sector provided 296 jobs in 91 businesses.  In 2013 a total of 8.9% of the population received social assistance.

Politics
In the 2011 federal election the most popular party was the SVP with 41.5% of the vote.  The next three most popular parties were the CVP (18.2%), the SP (13.0%) and the FDP (8.6%).  In the federal election, a total of 732 votes were cast, and the voter turnout was 52.2%.

Crime
In 2014 the crime rate, of the over 200 crimes listed in the Swiss Criminal Code (running from murder, robbery and assault to accepting bribes and election fraud), in Mettauertal was 13.6 per thousand residents.  This rate is only 21.1% of the average rate in the entire country.  During the same period, the rate of drug crimes was 4.2 per thousand residents, which is 42.4% of the national rate.  The rate of violations of immigration, visa and work permit laws was 0 per thousand residents.

References

Municipalities of Aargau
Cultural property of national significance in Aargau
Populated places established in 2010